The 2011–12 First League of the Federation of Bosnia and Herzegovina was the seventeenth season of the First League of the Federation of Bosnia and Herzegovina, the second tier football league of Bosnia and Herzegovina, since its original establishment and the twelfth as a unified federation-wide league. The 2011–12 fixtures were announced on 13 July 2011. It began on 13 August 2011 and ended on 9 June 2012; a winter break where no matches were played was in effect between 19 November 2011 and 10 March 2012. GOŠK were the last champions, having won their first championship title in the 2010–11 season and earning a promotion to Premier League of Bosnia and Herzegovina while in this season Gradina won their first championship title of the First League of the Federation of Bosnia and Herzegovina.

16 clubs participated in this session, eleven returning from the previous session, one relegated from Premier League of Bosnia and Herzegovina and four promoted from four regional Second League of the Federation of Bosnia and Herzegovina.

Changes from last season

Team changes

From First League of the FBiH

Promoted to Premier League
 GOŠK

Relegated to one of 4 respective regional Second League of the FBiH
 Radnik (H) (Second League of the FBiH – Center)
 Igman (K) (Second League of the FBiH – South)
 Slaven (Second League of the FBiH – North)
 Bosna (V) (Second League of the FBiH – Center)

To First League of FBiH

Relegated from Premier League

 Budućnost

Promoted from four regional Second League of the FBiH
 Bratstvo (Second League of the FBiH – North)
 Branitelj (Second League of the FBiH – South)
 Vitez (Second League of the FBiH – West 1)1
 UNIS (Second League of the FBiH – Center)
1After winning the play-off against the winner of Second League of the FBiH – West 2 Podgrmeč. After 2010–11 session, West 1 and West 2 leagues merged in one, Second League of the FBiH – West.

Change of name

SAŠK Napredak, which competed last session in First league of the FBiH, faced a crisis and sold their position and club to Famos, which competed in the Second League of the FBiH – Center. As they could not just sell their position the two clubs merged in one under the name Famos-SAŠK Napredak and continued to compete in First League of the FBiH in this session. In the next session the club will return its name to Famos.

Teams

Radnik, Igman, Slaven i Bosna were relegated to their respective third-level league at the end of the 2010–11 season. For Bosna this is the worst league tier they played in since independence of BiH. The promoted and relegated teams were replaced by the champions of the four third–level leagues, Bratstvo Gračanica from the Second League of the FBiH – North, Branitelj from the Second League of the FBiH – South, Vitez from the Second League of the FBiH – West and UNIS from the Second League of the FBiH – Center.

Stadia and locations

League table

Positions by round

Results

Clubs season-progress

Season statistics

Top goalscorers

See also
2010–11 First League of the Federation of Bosnia and Herzegovina
2011–12 First League of the Republika Srpska
2011–12 Premier League of Bosnia and Herzegovina
2011–12 Kup Bosne i Hercegovine
Football Federation of Bosnia and Herzegovina

References

External links
Official site for the Football Federation of Bosnia and Herzegovina
Official site for the Football Federation of the Federation of Bosnia and Herzegovina
Official site for the Football Federation of the Republika of Srpska

 

First League of the Federation of Bosnia and Herzegovina seasons
2
Bos